The 2011 season was Incheon United's eighth season in the K-League in South Korea. Incheon United was competing in K-League, League Cup and Korean FA Cup.

Current squad

Match results

K-League

League table

Results summary

Results by round

Korean FA Cup

League Cup

Squad statistics

Appearances and goals
Statistics accurate as of match played 30 October 2011

Top scorers

Top assistors

Discipline

Transfer

In
 8 July 2011 –  Kwon Jung-Hyuk – Free Agent
 28 July 2011 –  Kim Han-Seob – Daejeon Citizen
 3 August 2011 –  Elionar – ABC Futebol Clube (loan)
 16 September 2011 –  Almir – Free Agent

Out
 6 May 2011 –  Yoon Ki-Won – Dead
 6 July 2011 –  Diego Giaretta – free agent
 24 July 2011 –  Yoo Byung-Soo – Al-Hilal FC
 28 July 2011 –  Kim Han-Seob – Daejeon Citizen
 28 July 2011 –  Jeon Bo-Hoon – Daejeon Citizen
 28 July 2011 –  Luizinho – Free Agent
 3 August 2011 –  Lee Sung-Yong – Free Agent
 3 August 2011 –  Kim Ba-Wi – Thai Port FC
 3 August 2011 –  Choi Soo-Bin – Saraburi FC

References

South Korean football clubs 2011 season
2011